The 2011–12 Primera División (women) season will be the 24th since its establishment. Rayo Vallecano are the defending champions, having won their 3rd title in the previous season. The campaign will begin on 4 September 2011, and end on 27 May 2012.

A total of 18 teams will contest the league, 16 of which already contested in the 2010–11 season and two of which were promoted from the Liga Nacional.

With ten wins in a row at the start of the season, Barcelona broke the Spanish women's starting record of Levante's nine wins in 2008/09. This streak was broken on matchday 15, when Barcelona drew Espanyol 3–3.

On the last match day, Barcelona secured their very first Spanish championship title.

Changes from 2010–11
For this season, the league will use a double round-robin format, contrary to previous seasons were teams were divided in three regional groups of which the best placed teams progressed to a national group stage. 
The league was also reduced to 18 teams. Now, the bottom four placed teams will be relegated.
The tie-breakers in place are with two teams tied: points in direct matches, goal difference in direct matches, goals scored in direct matches, goal difference in all matches, goals scored in all matches. If the tie can't be broken down, one or more play-off games are held at a neutral venue.

Teams

Stadia and locations

Personnel and sponsorship

League table

Results

Top scorers 
Sonia of Barcelona won the top-scorer award with 38 goals.

See also
 2011–12 Segunda División (women)
 2012 Copa de la Reina

References

External links
Season on soccerway.com
Season on marca.com

2011-12
Spa
1
women